Dryotribus is a genus of beetle in family Curculionidae. It contains the following species:
Dryotribus amplioculus
 Dryotribus mimeticus
 Dryotribus solitarius 
 Dryotribus wilderi

References 

Cossoninae
Taxonomy articles created by Polbot